SS U.S.O was a Liberty ship of the United States during World War II, named after the United Service Organizations, an organization designed to provide morale to servicemen deployed all around the world.

Built at the Bethlehem-Fairfield Shipyard in Baltimore, Maryland under MC contract (hull number 1811), the ship was laid down on 29 September 1943, and launched on 21 October 1943. The ship survived the war and was sold into private ownership in 1947. However, in 1967, the ship was wrecked and subsequently scrapped.

References

1943 ships
Liberty ships
Maritime incidents in November 1945